The Woods Academy is an independent, Catholic, preschool, lower school, and middle school for girls and boys ages three through fourteen, with an enrollment, as of the 2019–20 school year, of 261 students.  The school is located on six acres in the Washington D.C. suburb of Bethesda, Maryland, U.S.

History

The school originally opened over a half century ago as Ursuline Academy.  In 1975, a group of dedicated parents re-established it as Our Lady of the Woods Academy and subsequently The Woods Academy.  In 1977, the school moved to its current location at the intersection of Burdette and Greentree Road in Bethesda.

School organization
 Montessori School Children ages 3 to 5 are welcome to participate in the Montessori Program at The Woods Academy. This program is accredited by the American Montessori Society.
 Lower School The Woods Academy Lower School includes grades 1 through 4. Students focus on literacy and math. They also have daily foreign language lessons and experiences in various forms of art.
 Upper School The Woods Academy Upper School includes grade 5 through 8. Students start to rotate to various classes and have content-specific teachers. The academics are rigorous and are designed to prepare students for high levels of success in elite high schools and colleges.

Head of School
Joe Powers is the head of school. He joined the school in the summer of 2011. He was previously the headmaster at the Washington Jesuit Academy. In September 2022, Powers announced his intention to leave the school at the end of the 2022–23 school year.

Affiliations 
The Woods Academy is affiliated with the following organizations:

Notable people 
 M. Virginia Rosenbaum, county surveyor and newspaper editor; attended Ursuline Academy, a predecessor to the Woods Academy.

References

External links
 
 
 Joe Power's (head of school since 2011) blog on Woods Academy and news in the education world

Catholic schools in Maryland
Catholic elementary schools in the United States
Catholic middle schools in the United States
Catholic K–8 schools in the United States
Private middle schools in Maryland
Private elementary schools in Maryland
Educational institutions established in 1975
1975 establishments in Maryland